Anbar Bozan (also Romanized as ‘Anbar Bozān; also known as  Bozān and Mareh Bozān) is a village in Abidar Rural District, in the Central District of Sanandaj County, Kurdistan Province, Iran. At the 2006 census, its population was 269, in 67 families. The village is populated by Kurds.

References 

Towns and villages in Sanandaj County
Kurdish settlements in Kurdistan Province